Grace Abbott (November 17, 1878 – June 19, 1939) was an American social worker who specifically worked in improving the rights of immigrants and advancing child welfare, especially the regulation of child labor. Her elder sister, Edith Abbott, who was a social worker, educator and researcher, had professional interests that often complemented those of Grace's.

Biography
Born in Grand Island, Nebraska, the daughter of O. A. Abbott and Elizabeth M. Griffin, Grace graduated from Grand Island College in 1898. Before embarking on her career in social work, she was employed as a high school teacher in her hometown through 1906. In 1903, she started graduate studies at the University of Nebraska-Lincoln.

In 1907, she moved to Chicago, where she entered the career of social work. She took up residency in the Hull House, an urban center for women engaged in early proto-feminism and social reform, as well as a safe haven for the poor. In 1909, Abbott received a Ph.M. in political science from the University of Chicago. She wrote a series of weekly articles in the Chicago Evening Post, titled Within the City's Gates from 1909–1910, which brought to light the exploitation of immigrants.

Abbott served on several committees and organizations for advancing the societal cause of child welfare, including the Immigrants' Protective League (1908-1917), Child Labor Division of the U.S. Children's Bureau (1921 to 1934) and was also a member of the Women's Trade Union League. In 1911, she co-founded the Joint Committee for Vocational Training with Sophonisba Breckenridge, PhD, JD, and Edith Abbott, PhD, JD.

From 1917–1919, she was the director of the child labor division of the U.S. Children's Bureau. It was in this capacity that she was responsible for administering the Keating-Owen Act (1916). This law was reversed by the U.S. Supreme Court in 1918. She was responsible for portions of this law continuing by inserting clauses into the war-goods contracts between the federal government and private industries.

In 1924, she worked tirelessly to pass a constitutional amendment against child labor, an amendment that never gained statewide ratification. Abbott was an author of several sociological texts, including The Immigrant and the Community (1917) and The Child and the State (1938, 2 volumes). She was also responsible for incorporating social statistics and research into legislative policy-making, as well as investigating child labor violations in shipbuilding plants and in factories across the United States.

Abbott pioneered the process of incorporating sociological data relating to child labor, juvenile delinquency, dependency and statistics into the lawmaking process; she spent much of her time as a political lobbyist for social issues in Washington, D.C. She was associated with the Social Security Administration from 1934 until her death in 1939; during that time period, Abbott helped draft the Social Security Act and chaired several government committees on child welfare and social issues.

She was the first woman to be nominated for a Presidential cabinet position, but was not confirmed. Her mother was a Quaker turned Unitarian and her father, Othman A. Abbott, was the first Lt. Gov. of the state of Nebraska. Grace never married. She was a professor of public welfare at the University of Chicago from 1934 until 1939.

During a 1938 health checkup, doctors discovered that she was suffering from multiple myeloma. The disease caused her death one year later. Cancer was considered such a dreaded disease at the time that she and her sister hid her diagnosis and her obituary in The New York Times listed her cause of death as "anemia".

Abbott is a member of the Nebraska Hall of Fame.

The School of Social Work at the University of Nebraska at Omaha is named in her honor.

References

Further reading

External links 
 
 Abbott, Grace (1917) The Immigrant and the Community on Google Books
 Edith and Grace Abbott, Papers at the University of Nebraska-Lincoln
  at Nebraska State Historical Society
 Grace Abbott Reader edited by John Sorensen with Judith Sealander (University of Nebraska Press, 2008)
 The Abbott Sisters Living Legacy Project at the Grace Abbott School of Social Work
 Edith and Grace Abbott Papers at the University of Chicago Special Collections Research Center

1878 births
1939 deaths
American social workers
Child labor in the United States
Deaths from multiple myeloma
People from Grand Island, Nebraska
Progressive Era in the United States
Women's Trade Union League people
Deaths from cancer in Illinois